Johnny Marzetti is an American pasta dish in the cuisine of the Midwestern United States prepared with noodles, cheese, ground beef or Italian sausage, and a tomato sauce that may include aromatic vegetables and mushrooms.

History 
Johnny Marzetti originated in Columbus, Ohio at Marzetti's, an Italian restaurant established in 1896 at Woodruff Avenue and High Street by an Italian immigrant named Teresa Marzetti. One of the dishes Marzetti offered her customers was a baked casserole of ground beef, cheese, tomato sauce, and noodles that she named for her brother-in-law, Johnny. Teresa Marzetti was the first person to serve the casserole Johnny Marzetti in a restaurant. Proximity to the nearby Ohio State University helped the first restaurant succeed and spread Marzetti's fame.

By the 1920s, it had become popular across Ohio and the Midwestern United States. The original restaurant closed in 1942, but a second location, opened in 1919, remained in operation until Teresa Marzetti died in 1972. Marzetti's later became known for various salad dressings, which are still produced under the T. Marzetti Company label.

Johnny Marzetti also became a popular dish in the former Panama Canal Zone, where Panamanian locals referred to the dish as "Johnny Mazetti".

In Season 3, Episode 18 of Gilmore Girls, "Happy Birthday, Baby," Johnny Marzetti casserole is referred to as "Johnny Machete", a dish  Richard Gilmore's grandmother made for him when he was feeling sad.

See also

 List of casserole dishes
 List of pasta dishes

References

External links
Kitchen Mailbox: Johnny Marzetti immortalized as casserole

Casserole dishes
Cuisine of the Midwestern United States
Ground meat
Italian-American cuisine
American pasta dishes
American meat dishes